Mallinella elegans is a species of spider in the family Zodariidae. It is found in Malaysia.

References 

Zodariidae
Arthropods of Malaysia
Spiders described in 2012
Spiders of Asia